The 2016–17 Superliga was the 61st season of the Polish Superliga, the top men's handball league in Poland. A total of fourteen teams contested this season's league, which began on 9 September 2016 and concluded on 27 May 2017. 

Vive Tauron Kielce won their 14th title of the Polish Champions.

Format
The competition format for the 2016–17 season consisted of 2 groups of seven teams each playing a total of 26 matches, half at home and half away, with the top 3 teams of each group qualifying directly for the quarterfinals. The teams ranked 4th and 5th play for a place in the quarterfinals.

Regular season
A victory over a team of the same group add 1 extra point.

Grenade Group

Orange Group

Results

Playoffs

First round

|}

Final round

Final standings

References

External links
 Official website 

Poland
Superliga
Superliga
Superliga
Superliga